Griffon Vendéen may refer to any one of a number of French dog breeds:

 Briquet Griffon Vendéen
 Grand Basset Griffon Vendéen
 Grand Griffon Vendéen
 Petit Basset Griffon Vendéen